Garage Hymns is the second full-length album by American indie-rock band Empires, released in 2012.

Reception

Consequence of Sound called Garage Hymns "...Springsteen-esque classic rock earnestness as well as The Gaslight Anthem and The Killers in their best moments.".

RedEye stated that the "explosive 'Hell’s Heroes,' unveiled when Empires landed in the final four in Rolling Stone’s competition to land an unsigned band on its cover, demands a big venue from which to soar.".

The Phoenix wrote "Sean Van Vleet's voice brims with determined grit and a starry-eyed upper register — half Brian Fallon warble, half Eddie Vedder exuberance— while guitarists Tom Conrad and Max Steger bash out riffs informed by punk velocity, post-punk darkness, and a bar band's reckless abandon.".

Track listing

Personnel
 Words by Sean Van Vleet 
 Music by Empires 
 Produced, engineered & mixed by Max Steger 
 Recorded at Thunderdome Studios, Chicago, IL 
 Production Assistance and additional keyboards by Wil Masisak 
 Mastered by Jeff Lipton at Peerless Mastering
 Boston, MA. Assistant Mastering Engineer: Maria Rice 
 Artwork & photography by Tom Conrad

References

2012 albums